The Cumberland County, until 21 March 1778, known as the Unity County, was a county in Vermont Republic. It was established on 17 March 1778, being formed from the counties of Cumberland and Gloucester from the state of New York, United States, that were acquired by Vermont. It existed until 1781, when it got partitioned into three other counties: Orange, Windham, and Windsor.

History 
The county was established on 17 March 1778, under the name Unity County. It was formed from the counties of Cumberland and Gloucester from the state of New York, United States, that were acquired by the Vermont Republic. Three days later, on 21 March, it was renamed Cumberland County. In 1781, it got partitioned into three other counties: Orange, Windham, and Windsor.

See also
List of counties in Vermont
List of New York counties
List of former United States counties

References

Further reading
 Benjamin H. Hall. The History of Eastern Vermont from its earliest settlement to the close of the 18th century (Albany, New York, 1858)

Former counties of the United States
Pre-statehood history of Vermont
1778 establishments in Vermont
1781 disestablishments in Vermont